Karz or KARZ may refer to:

Films 
 Karz (film), a 1980 Hindi thriller film
 Karz: The Burden of Truth, a 2002 Hindi film
 Karzzzz, a 2008 remake of the 1980 film

Places 
 Karz, Kandahar, a village in Kandahar Province, Afghanistan

Radio and TV stations 
 KARZ (FM), a radio station (99.7 FM) licensed to Marshall, Minnesota, United States
 KARZ-TV, a television station (channel 28, virtual 42) licensed to Little Rock, Arkansas, United States
 KKCK, a radio station (94.7 FM) licensed to Springfield, Minnesota, which held the call sign KARZ from 2017 to 2019
 KNSG (FM), a radio station (107.5 FM) licensed to Marshall, Minnesota, which held the call sign KARZ from 1997 to 2017